Emanuel Rasberger (born 3 June 1972) is a Croatian former professional tennis player.

Rasberger, who had a best singles ranking of 543 in the world, competed as a wildcard in six editions of the Croatia Open, held in his home town of Umag. He is a nephew of tournament director Slavko Rasberger.

References

External links
 
 

1972 births
Living people
Croatian male tennis players
People from Umag